Kortessem is a municipality located in the Belgian province of Limburg near Hasselt. On January 1, 2006, Kortessem had a total population of 8,074. The total area is 33.90 km² which gives a population density of 238 inhabitants per km².

The municipality consists of the following sub-municipalities: Kortessem, Guigoven, Vliermaal, Vliermaalroot, and Wintershoven.

Up until its destruction by a storm in 2009, Kortessem was the home of the Onzelievehereboom: a 1200-year-old oak.

Since 16 May 2014 Herman Van Rompuy is an honorary citizen.

Since 1990 the most famous party of Vlaanderen, Nacht van de Hoegaarden, was made in Kortessem

Gallery

References

External links
 

Kovok Kortessem: Volleybalteam
kortessem.2link.be

Municipalities of Limburg (Belgium)